Gustavo Kuerten was the defending champion, but did not participate this year.

Mikhail Youzhny won the title, beating Karol Beck 6–2, 6–2 in the final.

Seeds

Draw

Finals

Top half

Bottom half

References

 Main Draw

St. Petersburg Open
2004 ATP Tour
2004 in Russian tennis